Phyllonorycter martiella is a moth of the family Gracillariidae. It is known from British Columbia, Nova Scotia and Québec in Canada and Maine, Michigan, North Carolina, Vermont and Kentucky in the United States.

The wingspan is about 6.8 mm.

The larvae feed on Betula species, including Betula lenta. They mine the leaves of their host plant. The mine has the form of an elongated mine on the underside of the leaf.

References

martiella
Moths of North America
Moths described in 1908